Thirteenth stroke of the clock or "thirteen strikes of the clock" is a phrase, saying, and proverb to indicate that the previous events or "strokes to the clock" must be called into question. This is illustrated in the fictional case of "Rex vs Haddock" in which a remark by one of the parties is compared to the thirteenth stroke of a clock: not only is this thirteenth strike itself discredited, but it casts a shade of doubt over all previous assertions. This proverb puts forth the notion that if just one of someone's proclamations is wrong, or something of a process is wrong, then the correctness and accuracy of all the previous items are called into question. In a legal case it brings forth the notion that perhaps none of the party's claims are valid, given that one of them is obviously wrong.

A physicist and mathematician notes the problem with his variation on the same general idea. He points out that if a clock strikes the thirteenth hour then it has counted wrongly and reflects on the other twelve hours of the clock's strokes as then they could also be wrong.

Within the 24-hour clock system used for official and technical purposes throughout most of the world, there is a time that could be called "13 o'clock".  However, the 24-hour system only came into widespread use in the 20th century, and most analogue clocks (including virtually all chiming or striking clocks) still work on the 12-hour system. A striking clock rings a bell once for each hour of the time. One ring is 1 o'clock, two rings is 2 o'clock, three rings is 3 o'clock, etc. Traditional clocks that strike a bell only mark 12 hours. After the twelfth hour with the twelve rings of the bell, the next hour should be with one ring only, indicating 1 o'clock plus twelve hours. Accordingly, with very rare exceptions, when a clock rings thirteen times it is indicating an impossible time and that the clock is not functioning correctly.  A children's riddle asks "What time is it when the clock strikes thirteen?" The answer is "Time to buy a new clock!"

Striking clock mechanism 

A 100-year-old tower striking clock has a striking mechanism, called a snail, with indentations that vary in depth progressively from one to twelve. It rotates via a gear drive over a twelve-hour period. Shortly before each hour a rack with twelve cuts along its length is released to contact the snail. This makes the number of cuts available to activate the strike mechanism correspond to the depth of the snail at that hour.

Testing the rack in its place allows it to fall until the tail rests on the lowest step of the snail. The hook of the rack should then hold the rack so that there are twelve teeth gathered up. Trying it on the highest step of the snail, should catch the first rack tooth. This leaves only one to be gathered up. If the clock strikes thirteen when on the lowest step and two when on the highest, it shows that the end of the rack tail is a little too far off from the snail and must be set a little closer. If on the other hand the snail strikes the right number when on the lowest step and two when on the highest, then the proportion between the snail and rack is wrong. The rack travel is too great for the rack.

Culture 

There is an 18th-century London legend of a clock that struck thirteen times and saved a man's life. The story goes that St Paul's Cathedral clock on one occasion struck thirteen bongs of the bell at midnight, with the result of saving the life of a soldier accused of sleeping at his post. An obituary notice of a John Hatfield that appeared in the Public Advertiser a few days after his death states that a soldier in the time of William III and Mary II was tried by a court-martial on a charge of having fallen asleep when on duty upon the terrace at Windsor. It goes on to say that he categorically denied the charge against him. He swore as a proof of his having been awake at the time that he heard St Paul's Cathedral clock strike thirteen, the truth of which was much doubted by the court because of the great distance. Affidavits were made by several persons verifying that the clock actually did strike thirteen instead of twelve, and the soldier was pardoned.

There is a poem that alludes to this published in July 1873 called A Trip to Windsor by Timothy Scribble:

An early 19th-century legend set in England also details the account of a clock striking thirteen at midnight and saving a man's life.  The clock in the tower of St. Andrews Church in Plymouth is said to have mysteriously struck thirteen on a night when two strangers stood under it, one of whom was Captain Jarvis.  They both remarked about how strange it was.  Weeks later, the other man was put on trial in Bodmin for having committed a murder on that night, and, not knowing even the name of the stranger who had witnessed the clock striking thirteen with him, had no alibi by which to clear himself.  Just prior to being sentenced as guilty of the murder, on the closing day of the trial, the judge asked him if he had any last words.  He replied saying he had nothing to say except that he was innocent, and only one man in the world, whom he did not know, could clear him, for they two had both heard the clock of St. Andrews Church in Plymouth strike thirteen on that night in question.  As he gave this testimony, Captain Jarvis, who had just arrived, called out that he was the man, and that the one on trial was innocent--after which he related his own miraculous turn of events that had brought him to the trial of this stranger, including riding a horse, not knowing where he went, which seemed guided to the very place of the trial.  As he was known by a number of those present in the court, Captain Jarvis' words were accepted without question, and the innocent man was set free.

Adolf Hitler is quoted as saying, "I make it a principle not to stop until the clock strikes thirteen". This was in reference to him never giving up as Germany did in the First World War. This was said in November 1942 as the almost certain defeat of the German army, at Stalingrad became certain, and the German army had retreated in North Africa. He wanted to point out to his enemy that he was not going to surrender under any circumstances, by using an analogy that theoretically could not happen.

Francis Egerton, 3rd Duke of Bridgewater, owned extensive coal mines near Manchester. He spent a fortune operating them and a canal to carry the coal to Manchester and Liverpool. He noticed that his workers ceased working the moment the bell struck twelve times at twelve o'clock, which was lunch time. They, however, were slow in returning to work at one o'clock. The excuse was that they did not hear the clock strike just once. The Duke then had the clock made to strike thirteen times at one o'clock, so that the men could no longer use the excuse that they did not hear it.

Mark Twain is claimed to have said: "The thirteenth stroke of the clock is not only false of itself, but casts grave doubt on the credibility of the preceding twelve".

Literature 
The idea of a clock striking thirteen times has shown up many times in literature. The most famous is the first line in George Orwell's Nineteen Eighty-Four when it starts with, "It was a bright cold day in April, and the clocks were striking thirteen". The famous children's book Tom's Midnight Garden by Philippa Pearce speaks of this phenomenon when it says "When Tom hears old Mrs Bartholomew's grandfather clock in the hall striking thirteen, he goes to investigate". Thomas Hardy wrote in Far from the Madding Crowd (1872): "This supreme instance of Troy's goodness fell upon Gabriel's ears like the thirteenth stroke of a crazy clock." (Chapter XXIX, Particulars of a twilight walk.)

Why don't 24-hour clocks strike thirteen? 
Most countries around the world use the 24-hour system for technical purposes and in documents such as timetables; the United States is an exception, although US military bodies do use the 24-hour clock. Most digital clocks can be set to show the time as, for example, 13:00, and this is frequently done. However, typical analogue clock design conserves the 12-hour system, and so does everyday speech. In English, in fact, the term "13 o'clock" is not used: in US military time, one would say "thirteen hundred hours" instead; in England, where most digital clocks are 24-hour, as are railway timetables, 13:00 is still conventionally referred to as "one", "one o'clock", "one o'clock pm", or "one pm". In other European languages, terms equivalent to "13 o'clock" are used, e.g. in French one usually refers to 1pm as "treize heures", though it would not be incorrect to say "une heure de l'après-midi", the equivalent of "1pm" or "Onze heures de deux heures", the equivalent of (11+2) hours.

See also 
 24-hour clock
 Century tower clocks

References 
Notes

Footnotes

Bibliography

Further reading 

Phrases
Clocks